The Yazidi Movement for Reform and Progress is a Yazidi political party in Iraq. The party represents Yazidis in the Nineveh Governorate. It has retained one seat in the Council of Representatives since 2005.

Election results

See also 
List of political parties in Iraq

References

Political parties of minorities in Iraq
Yazidi organizations in Iraq